Theertha Yathra (The Pilgrimage) is a 1999 Sri Lankan Sinhala drama thriller film directed by Vasantha Obeysekera and co-produced by Chandran Rutnam and Ashoka Perera. It stars Joe Abeywickrama, Channa Perera and Yashoda Wimaladharma in lead roles along with Chandrasoma Binduhewa and Samson Siripala. Music composed by Rohana Weerasinghe. It is the 922nd Sri Lankan film in the Sinhala cinema.

The film was selected by National Film Corporation (NFC) for screening at the Cairo International Film festival in 1999.

Plot

Cast
 Yashoda Wimaladharma as Menaka
 Chandralekha Perera as Kusal
 Joe Abeywickrama as Simon
 Ravindra Randeniya as Suriya Bandara
 Veena Jayakody as Grace
 Saumya Liyanage
 Susila Kottage
 Ravindra Yasas
 Channa Perera
 Ramani Fonseka
 Chandani Seneviratne
 Wilson Gunaratne
 Sasanthi Jayasekara
 Bandula Vithanage
 Chitra Warakagoda
 Gunawardena Hettiarachchi
 Mali Jayaweerage

References

External links
 Theertha Yathra on Sithma

1999 films
1990s Sinhala-language films
1990s thriller drama films
Sri Lankan thriller drama films
1999 drama films